Caraccochylis is a genus of moths in the  family Tortricidae. It consists of only one species, Caraccochylis framea, which is found in Minas Gerais, Brazil.

The wingspan is about 11 mm. The ground colour is cream, tinged with yellow-brown in the basal and subterminal parts of the wing. The markings are rust brown. The hindwings are cream grey.

Etymology
The generic name refers to Cochylis and the locality Caraca. The species name refers to the shape of the aedeagus and is derived from Latin framea (meaning spear).

References

Cochylini
Tortricidae genera
Monotypic moth genera